Iwan Otto Armand Knorr (3 January 1853 – 22 January 1916) was a German composer and music teacher.

Life
A native of Gniew, he attended the Leipzig Conservatory where he studied with Ignaz Moscheles, Ernst Friedrich Richter and Carl Reinecke. In 1874, he became a teacher and in 1878 director of music theory instruction at the Imperial Kharkiv Conservatory, in what is now Ukraine.

In 1883, he settled in Frankfurt, where he joined the faculty of the Hoch Conservatory. In 1908, he became director of the school. As a teacher he exerted great influence. Among his pupils were Bernhard Sekles, Ernest Bloch, Vladimir Sokalskyi, Ernst Toch and Hans Pfitzner, as well as the English-speaking composers such as William Beatton Moonie and friends that become known as the Frankfurt Group: Balfour Gardiner, Percy Grainger, Norman O'Neill, Roger Quilter and Cyril Scott.

Selected Compositions
 Variations on a theme by Robert Schumann, Op. 1 for Piano Trio
 Piano Quartet in E-flat major, Op. 3
 Ukrainian Liebeslieder, for vocal quartet and piano, Op. 5
 Variations on a Ukrainian Folksong, for orchestra, Op. 7
 Variations on a Russian Folksong, for piano duet, Op. 8
 Eight Songs, for mixed choir, Op. 11
 Symphonic Fantasy, Op. 12 (1899)
 Serenade in G Major, for orchestra, Op.17
 Dunja, opera in two acts, Op. 18 (premiered 1904 in Koblenz)
 Aus der Ukraine, suite for orchestra, Op. 20
 Die Hochzeit, opera (premiered 1907 in Prague)
 Durchs Fenster, opera in one act (premiered 1908 in Karlsruhe)

Writings
 Tchaikovsky (Berlin, 1900)
 Materials for Teaching Harmony (Leipzig: Breitkopf, 1903; 7 impressions)
 Handbook of Fugal Composition (Leipzig, 1911)
 The Fugues of Bach's Well-Tempered Clavier in Pictorial Representation (Leipzig, 1912)

References

David Ewen: Encyclopedia of Concert Music (New York: Hill and Wang, 1959)

External links
 

1853 births
1916 deaths
19th-century classical composers
19th-century German composers
19th-century German male musicians
20th-century classical composers
20th-century German composers
20th-century German male musicians
German music educators
German male classical composers
German Romantic composers
Academic staff of Hoch Conservatory
People from Tczew County
People from the Province of Prussia
Piano pedagogues
University of Music and Theatre Leipzig alumni